Stuart Boardley (born 14 February 1985) is an English former professional footballer. He played professionally for Torquay United and is currently manager of Felixstowe & Walton United.

Personal life 
Boardley was born in Ipswich and is the younger brother of the four time Hot Rods (oval racing) World Champion Carl Boardley. Boardley attended Northgate High School in Ipswich and left school with GCSEs and A-Levels to pursue a career in football. He recently married his childhood sweetheart Gemma Smith.

Playing career
Boardley, a midfielder, began his career as a trainee with Ipswich Town. His traineeship was extended due to injuries received in a car crash, but he was released in May 2004 without playing in the first team. Leroy Rosenior took him to Torquay United  in August 2004 and he signed a contract the following month. He made his Torquay debut on 28 September in the 4–3 win at home to Yeovil Town in the Football League Trophy. and shortly afterwards signed a contract. His league debut came on 2 October, in a 1–1 draw away to Peterborough United. He played many more times in the league for Torquay, and once in the FA Cup (a 2–0 defeat away to non-league Hinckley United), before being released in May 2005 following Torquay's relegation.

In the 2005 close-season he joined non-League side Long Melford, but chose to leave in November 2005, moving to Leiston, managed by former Ipswich Town and Tottenham Hotspur player Jason Dozzell, later the same month.

In June 2007, a fee was agreed which saw Boardley move to Isthmian League promotion chasers AFC Sudbury. Following the managerial resignation of Mark Morsley he rejoined Leiston for a second spell in June 2008.

In October 2008, Boardley scored twice as Leiston beat Conference National side Lewes in the Fourth Qualifying Round of the FA Cup, ensuring a place in the First Round proper for Leiston for the first time in their history. At that time he was reported to be working as a  quantity surveyor in Ipswich for Brooks and Wood Ltd. He joined Felixstowe & Walton United in 2017.

Managerial career
In October 2018 Boardley announced his retirement from playing football. Later in the same week he was appointed manager of Leiston, having previously been assistant to Richard Wilkins at the club during his second playing spell at the club.

He left Leiston in September 2019, and was appointed manager of Felixstowe & Walton United in October.

References

External links

1985 births
Living people
Sportspeople from Ipswich
English footballers
Association football midfielders
Ipswich Town F.C. players
Torquay United F.C. players
Long Melford F.C. players
Leiston F.C. players
A.F.C. Sudbury players
Felixstowe & Walton United F.C. players
English football managers
Leiston F.C. managers
Felixstowe & Walton United F.C. managers